Melvin Brown may refer to:

 Melvin Brown (footballer) (born 1979), Mexican footballer of Jamaican descent
 Melvin L. Brown (1931–1950), U.S. Army soldier who received the Medal of Honor
 Melvin R. Brown (born 1938), member of the Utah State House of Representatives
 Melvin Brown (American football) (1932–2018), American football coach and player
 Melvin Brown (music manager), American music manager
 Melvin Jerome Brown (born 1967), American chef

See also
Mel Brown (disambiguation)